Buddy Holderfield was the first boxer to have ever won the National Golden Gloves from Arkansas. He later went pro and lived in North Little Rock, Arkansas.
He fought 48 professional bouts. He had a record of 27 wins, 20 losses and one draw. He was known for his clever fighting styles that won crowds over. He helped out at the North Little Rock Boy's Club and their boxing team.  Holderfield was involved in professional boxing (1946-1955) along with Harold White (1946-1948) from Little Rock, both fought out of Memphis TN.

External links

Year of birth missing (living people)
Living people
Boxers from Arkansas
People from North Little Rock, Arkansas
American male boxers